S Tikuna (S-34) is a Type 209 submarine of the Brazilian Navy. Built in the Brazilian Navy Yard in Rio de Janeiro (AMRJ), it was launched in March 2005 and incorporated into the Brazilian Navy on July 21, 2006, and then transferred to the Naval Operations Command. It is the fourth Brazilian Navy submarine made in Brazil and the largest ever built in the country. The name of this submarine is a tribute to South American indigenous tribe Tikuna inhabiting the region of the Upper Solimões, in the western part of the State of Amazonas.

History

It was built in the Brazilian Navy Yard in Rio de Janeiro and was put out to sea at 10:30 of 9 March 2005. She was incorporated into the Navy on 16 December 2005, and then transferred to the Naval Operations Command. On 21 July 2006, she was transferred from the Department of Material for the Naval Operations Command, in a ceremony held at the Navy Yard in Rio de Janeiro.

The Tikuna is the fourth Brazilian Navy submarine built into the strategy of learning how to "Design, Construction and Repair" these resources and the largest submarine ever built by the country. She has a crew of seven officers and 29 enlisted, eight torpedo tubes and is powered by diesel-electric propulsion, with electric motor, batteries and sets of diesel-engine generators.

Design
Her design is based on that of the German IKL-209 design which originated the Tupi Class in Brazil. The Tikuna incorporates several technological innovations that provide better performance such as lower noise signature and longer period of submerged operation, particularly during battery recharge operations (Snorkel) while the vessel is snorkeling. These substantial innovations make this submarine the first in a new class bearing her name.

References

External links
 S-34 Tikuna on Brasil em Defesa 
 S-34 Tikuna on YouTube 

2005 ships
Tupi-class submarines
Ships built in Brazil